Aphrodisium or Aphrodision, also known as Aphrodisias (Ἀφροδισιάς), was a city of ancient Cyprus, situated at the narrowest part of the island, only 70 stadia from Salamis.

Its site is near the modern Liastrika, Akanthou, in the de facto Turkish Republic of Northern Cyprus.

References

Populated places in ancient Cyprus
Former populated places in Cyprus